Leave Me Alone may refer to:

Music

Albums
 Leave Me Alone (Nick Oliveri album) or the title song, 2014
 Leave Me Alone (Hinds album), 2016
 Leave Me Alone (S.O.B. album) or the title song, 1986

Songs
 "Leave Me Alone" (Alexander Rybak song), 2012
 "Leave Me Alone" (Flipp Dinero song), 2018
 "Leave Me Alone" (Hanna Pakarinen song), 2007
 "Leave Me Alone" (Jerry Cantrell song), 1996
 "Leave Me Alone" (Michael Jackson song), 1989
 "Leave Me Alone" (The Veronicas song), 2006
 "Leave Me Alone" (Xu Weizhou song), 2017
 "Leave Me Alone (I'm Lonely)", by Pink, 2007
 "Leave Me Alone (Let Me Cry)", by Dicky Doo & the Don'ts, 1958
 "Leave Me Alone (Ruby Red Dress)", by Helen Reddy, 1973
 "Oildale (Leave Me Alone)", by Korn, 2010
 "Leave Me Alone", by the Corrs from Forgiven, Not Forgotten
 "Leave Me Alone", by Extreme from Waiting for the Punchline
 "Leave Me Alone", by Graham Coxon from The Golden D
 "Leave Me Alone", by I Dont Know How But They Found Me from Razzmatazz
 "Leave Me Alone", by Killing Heidi, B-side of the single "Mascara"
 "Leave Me Alone", by Natalie Imbruglia from Left of the Middle
 "Leave Me Alone", by New Order from Power, Corruption & Lies
 "Leave Me Alone", by NF from The Search
 "Leave Me Alone", by Santana from Santana IV
 "Leave Me Alone", by Tech N9ne from K.O.D.

Other uses
 Leave Me Alone (film), a 2004 Hong Kong film directed by Danny Pang
 Leave Me Alone!, a 2016 picture book by Vera Brosgol
 Leave Me Alone, a 1958 novel by David Karp
 Leave Me Alone: A Novel of Chengdu, a novel by Murong Xuecun